Fleur Mellor (born 13 July 1936) is an Australian athlete and Olympic champion. She competed at the 1956 Olympic Games in Melbourne, where she received a gold medal in 4 x 100 m relay, with Shirley Strickland de la Hunty, Norma Croker and Betty Cuthbert. Their winning time (44.5) was a new world record.

References

External links 
 
 

1936 births
Living people
Australian female sprinters
Olympic athletes of Australia
Athletes (track and field) at the 1956 Summer Olympics
Olympic gold medalists for Australia
Medalists at the 1956 Summer Olympics
Olympic gold medalists in athletics (track and field)
Olympic female sprinters